Emsworth is a town in the Borough of Havant in the county of Hampshire, England, near the border of West Sussex and located at by the south coast of England. It lies at the north end of an arm of Chichester Harbour, a large and shallow inlet from the English Channel and is equidistant between Portsmouth and Chichester.

Emsworth had a population of 9,492 at the 2011 Census. The town has a basin for yachts and fishing boats, which fills at high tide and can be emptied through a sluice at low tide. In geodemographic segmentation the town is the heart of the Emsworth (cross-county) built-up area, the remainder of which is Westbourne, Southbourne and Nutbourne. The area had a combined population of 18,777 in 2011, with a density of 30.5 people per hectare and shares two railway stations.

Etymology
According to Richard Coates the meaning of Emsworth is derived from the Old English , which translates as 'Æmmele's curtilage'.
It is popularly thought that Emsworth derived its name from the River Ems, this is not true, as before the 16th Century the stream was actually called the Bourne. The river was renamed by the 16th century chronicler Raphael Holinshed:

History

Pre-Roman

In prehistoric and early historical times the River Ems was tidal as far as Westbourne and the Westbrook creek reached to Victoria Road, leaving Emsworth almost isolated at high tide. A coastal route developed that led from Hayling Island through Havant and Rowlands Castle to the Downs. A part of the coastal route followed the Portsdown ridgeway and from Chichester to Belmont Hill in Bedhampton probably skirted the heads of the various creeks which entered the harbour, passing through country still covered with the original thick forest of oak and beech.

Roman

In Roman times a villa existed to the south of the road to Noviomagus Reginorum in the fields of what is now Warblington Castle Farm. Archaeological finds show that the building was a sizeable brick and stone edifice, with floors paved with red brick and coloured sandstone and a view of the harbour and wooded shores of Hayling Island. The fertile landscape suggests the area to have been under continuous cultivation for 1500–1800 years.

Anglo-Saxon

Saxons began settling the area after AD 500. Charters were granted by Kings Æthelstan and Æthelred in AD 935 and AD 980 establishing and confirming the boundaries of Warblington. From AD 980-1066 the manor was held by Godwin, Earl of Wessex and his son Harold Godwinson.

Medieval

After the Norman Conquest, the Manor of Warblington was given to Roger de Montgomery, Earl of Shrewsbury as part of the manor of Westbourne. The Domesday Book lists the latter with two churches, a mill, 29 families and two slaves (about 120 people). There were also seven plough teams, indicating about 850 acres of land under cultivation.

The first recorded mention of Emsworth as a separate entity was in AD 1216, when King John divided the manor of Warblington, accepting annual rent of ‘a pair of gilt spurs yearly’ from William Aguillon for land at Emelsworth. In AD 1239, Henry III granted the town a weekly market on Wednesdays and an annual fair on 7 July. The town was mentioned in a patent roll of a hospital in the Hermitage area in AD 1251.

In AD 1341 Emsworth was designated as one of five English towns required to provide a ship for defence of the Channel Islands. It was designated as a customs landing for Chichester in AD 1346 and in AD 1348 was investigated by a special commission for smuggling.

18th and 19th centuries

During the 18th and 19th centuries, Emsworth was still a port. Emsworth was known for shipbuilding, boat building and rope making. Grain from the area was ground into flour by tidal mills and transported by ship to places such as London and Portsmouth. Timber from the area was also exported in the 18th and 19th centuries. The River Ems, which is named after the town (not, as often believed, the town being named after the river), flows into the Slipper millpond. The mill itself is now used as offices.

In the 19th century Emsworth had as many as 30 pubs and beer houses; today, only nine remain.

At the beginning of the 19th century, Emsworth had a population of less than 1,200 but it was still considered a large village for the time. By the end of the 18th century, it became fashionable for wealthy people to spend the summer by the sea. In 1805 a bathing house was built where people could have a bath in seawater.

The parish Church of St James was built in 1840 to a design by John Elliott. It was expanded in the late 1850s this time to a design by John Colson.  Colson's designs were again used in an expansion of 1865.  A final round of building took place in the early 1890s this time to a design by Arthur Blomfield.  The reredos added in the 1920s features a painting by Percy George Bentham.

Queen Victoria visited Emsworth in 1842, resulting in Queen Street and Victoria Road being named after her. In 1847 the London, Brighton and South Coast Railway (now the West Coastway line) came to Emsworth, with a railway station built to serve the town.

Hollybank House to the north of the town was built in 1825 and is now a hotel.

Emsworth became part of Warblington Urban District which held its first meeting in 1895. The Urban District was abolished in 1932. Emsworth subsequently became part of Havant Urban District.

Modern
By 1901 the population of Emsworth was about 2,000. It grew rapidly during the 20th century to about 5,000 by the middle of the century. In 1906 construction began on the post office, with local cricketer George Wilder laying an inscribed brick. The renamed Emsworth Recreation Ground dates from 1909 and is the current home of Emsworth Cricket Club, which was founded in 1811. Cricket in Emsworth has been played at the same ground, Cold Harbour Lawn, since 1761.

In 1902 the once famous Emsworth oyster industry went into rapid decline. This was after many of the guests at mayoral banquets in Southampton and Winchester became seriously ill and four died after consuming oysters. The infection was due to oysters sourced from Emsworth, as the oyster beds had been contaminated with raw sewage. Fishing oysters at Emsworth was subsequently halted until new sewers were dug, though the industry never completely recovered. Recently, Emsworth's last remaining oyster boat, The Terror, was restored and is now sailing again. But the oyster industry is again under threat, because the reproductive rate of the oysters has plunged, as they now contain microscopic glass spicules that are shed into the water from the hulls of the numerous plastic fibreglass boats in Chichester Harbour.

During the Second World War, nearby Thorney Island was used as a Royal Air Force station, playing a role in defence in the Battle of Britain. The north of Emsworth at this time was used for growing flowers and further north was woodland (today Hollybank Woods). In the run up to D-Day, the Canadian Army used these woods as one of their pre-invasion assembly points for men and material. Today the foundations of their barracks can still be seen. In the 1960s large parts of this area were developed with a mix of bungalow and terraced housing.

For a few years (2001 to 2007), Emsworth held a food festival. It was the largest event of its type in the UK, with more than 50,000 visitors in 2007. The festival was cancelled due to numerous complaints of disruption to residents and businesses in the proximity.

A Baptist church was constructed in north street in 2015.

The harbour is now used for recreational sailing, paddle boarding, kayaking and swimming. The town has two sailing clubs, Emsworth Sailing Club (established in 1919) and Emsworth Slipper Sailing Club (in 1921), the latter based at Quay Mill, a former tide mill. Both clubs organise a programme of racing and social events during the sailing season.

Culture and community
Emsworth Library was considered for closure in 2020 but following public consultation, was reprieved. Emsworth Museum is administered by the Emsworth Maritime & Historical Trust. The town is twinned with Saint-Aubin-sur-Mer in Normandy, France In April 2014, Emsworth Sailing Club received national media coverage when retired Royal Navy Captain Clifford "John" Caughey drove his car into the clubhouse, causing a loud explosion and requiring thirty firefighters to extinguish the blaze.

Politics
The town is part of the Havant constituency, which since the 1983 election has been a Conservative seat. The current Member of Parliament (MP) is Alan Mak MP. The town is represented at Havant Borough Council by Councillors Richard Kennett, Julie Thain-Smith and Lulu Bowerman. The local Hampshire County Councillor is Lulu Bowerman. The town has branches of the Conservative Party, Liberal Democrats, the Labour Party and United Kingdom Independence Party.

Transport
Emsworth railway station is on the West Coastway Line. It has services that run to Portsmouth, Southampton, Brighton and London Victoria.

Stagecoach South operates the number 700 bus, which runs between Brighton and Southsea.

 Havant Borough Council claims local bus services are provided by Emsworth & District, First and Stagecoach.

Famous residents
 Denise Black (1958–), actress. Best known for playing Denise Osbourne in Coronation Street and Hazel in Queer as Folk.
  Peter Blake  (1948–2001), yachtsman. Broke the world record for the fastest solo circumnavigation of the globe in 1994.
 William Buckler (1814–1884), artist and entomologist, lived in Emsworth from the 1860s and died in Lumley in 1884.
  Peter Danckwerts  (1916–1984), Royal Navy officer, chemical engineer and academic.
 Albert Finney (1936–2019), actor. Recipient of BAFTA, Golden Globe and Emmy awards.
  Mark Evelyn Heath  (1927–2005), diplomat. Former British Ambassador to the Holy See (1980–1985).
 Thomas Hellyer (1811–1894), architect of many buildings in Hampshire and on the Isle of Wight, was born in Emsworth.
 Nicholas Lyndhurst (1961–), actor. Best known for playing Rodney Trotter in Only Fools and Horses.
  David Richards  (1952–), British Army officer. Former Chief of the Defence Staff (2010–2013).
 Lee Spencer (1963–), musician, music theorist and record producer.
 Malcolm Waldron (1956–), footballer. Played for Southampton, Burnley and Portsmouth.
 Joel Ward (footballer)
 William Whitcher (1832–1910), cricketer. Played for Hampshire.
 George Wilder (1876–1948), cricketer. Played for Hampshire and Sussex.
 P. G. Wodehouse (1881–1975), writer. Bibliography includes the Jeeves and Wooster and Blandings Castle series

See also
 List of places of worship in the Borough of Havant

Notes

References

Further reading
 Whitfield, Robert. Emsworth: A History. Chichester: Phillimore & Co. Ltd., 2005.

External links

 Emsworth Community Association
 Emsworth Museum

 
Borough of Havant
Towns in Hampshire